Fintice is a village and municipality in Prešov District in the Prešov Region of eastern Slovakia.

History
In historical records the village was first mentioned in 1272.

Geography

Genealogical resources
The records for genealogical research are available at the state archive "Statny Archiv in Presov, Slovakia"
 Roman Catholic church records (births/marriages/deaths): 1809-1895 (parish B)
 Greek Catholic church records (births/marriages/deaths): 1818-1895 (parish B)
 Lutheran church records (births/marriages/deaths): 1704-1895 (parish B)

See also
 List of municipalities and towns in Slovakia

References

External links
 
 
Surnames of living people in Fintice

Villages and municipalities in Prešov District
Šariš